
The following lists events that happened during 1818 in South Africa.

Events
 Xhosas clash with the white settlers on the eastern frontier starting the 5th Cape Frontier War that only ends the following year
 Settlers move beyond the Orange River
 Beaufort West is founded
 27 August – Cradock is founded

Births
 16 May – Willem Cornelis Janse van Rensburg, the second president of the South African Republic, is born on the farm near Beaufort West in the Cape Colony

References
See Years in South Africa for list of References

 
South Africa
Years in South Africa